WFP Goodwill Ambassador is an official postnominal honorific title, title of authority, legal status and job description assigned to those goodwill ambassadors and advocates who are designated by the United Nations. WFP goodwill ambassadors are celebrity representatives of the World Food Programme (WFP) who use their talent and popularity to advocate for hunger and food security.

Current WFP goodwill ambassadors 
Current listed and supporting goodwill ambassadors, and the year they were appointed:

See also 
 Goodwill Ambassador
 FAO Goodwill Ambassador
 UNDP Goodwill Ambassador
 UNESCO Goodwill Ambassador
 UNHCR Goodwill Ambassador
 UNODC Goodwill Ambassador
 UNFPA Goodwill Ambassador
 UNIDO Goodwill Ambassador
 UNICEF Goodwill Ambassador
 UN Women Goodwill Ambassador
 WHO Goodwill Ambassador

References

External links 

 WFP Goodwill Ambassadors, Advocates and High-Level Supporters

Goodwill ambassador programmes
United Nations goodwill ambassadors
World Food Programme